White Thunder Creek is a stream in the U.S. state of South Dakota.

White Thunder Creek has the name of White Thunder, an Indian chief.

See also
List of rivers of South Dakota

References

Rivers of Mellette County, South Dakota
Rivers of Todd County, South Dakota
Rivers of South Dakota